Rachel Beer (née Sassoon; 7 April 1858 – 29 April 1927) was an Indian-born British newspaper editor. She was editor-in-chief of The Observer and The Sunday Times.

Early life
Rachel Sassoon was born in Bombay to Sassoon David Sassoon, of the Baghdadi Jewish Sassoon merchant family, one of the wealthiest families of the 19th century; her father was known as the "Rothschild of the East". As a young woman, she volunteered as a nurse in a hospital.

In 1887, she married the wealthy financier Frederick Arthur Beer, son of Julius Beer (1836–1880), and converted to Christianity. Frederick, an Anglican Christian, was also from a family of ethnically Jewish converts to Christianity. In the wake of her conversion, the family disowned her.

The Beers had their roots as a banking family in the Frankfurt ghetto. In the UK they were financiers whose investments included ownership of newspapers.

Journalism career
Soon after she married Frederick, she began contributing articles to The Observer, which the Beer family then owned. In 1891, she took over as editor, becoming the first female editor of a national newspaper in the process. Two years later, she purchased The Sunday Times and became the editor of that newspaper as well. Though "not . . . a brilliant editor", she was known for her "occasional flair and business-like decisions".

Dreyfus affair

During her time as editor, The Observer achieved one of its greatest exclusives. A torn-up handwritten note, referred to throughout the affair as the bordereau, was found by a French housekeeper in a wastebasket at the German Embassy in Paris. The bordereau described a minor French military secret, and had obviously been written by a spy in the French military. Jewish French Army Captain Alfred Dreyfus was found guilty of the crime on no reliable evidence, and imprisoned on Devil's Island. The actual culprit, Major Count Esterhazy, was found not guilty on trial, but he was declared unfit for service, and fled to London. Beer knew that Esterhazy was in London because The Observer'''s Paris correspondent had made a connection with him; she interviewed him twice, and he confessed to being the culprit: I wrote the bordereau. She published the interviews in September 1898, reporting his confession and writing a leader column accusing the French military of antisemitism and calling for a retrial for the innocent Dreyfus.

Despite this evidence, Dreyfus was found guilty again in a later trial, but following a public outcry was pardoned into house arrest in 1899, and finally exonerated on 12 July 1906, with his military commission restored and promoted to major.

Last years
Frederick died of syphilis in 1901, having passed it on to his wife. Her own behaviour grew increasingly erratic, culminating in a collapse. The following year she was committed and her trustees sold both newspapers. Although she subsequently recovered, Beer required nursing care for the remainder of her life, spending her final years at Chancellor House in Tunbridge Wells, where she died of the disease in 1927.

In her will she left a generous legacy to her nephew Siegfried Sassoon, enabling him to purchase Heytesbury House in Wiltshire, where he spent the rest of his life. In honour of her bequest, Siegfried hung an oil portrait of his aunt above the fireplace.

Her brother, Alfred, had been cut off by his family for marrying outside the Jewish faith; though Beer had also married a gentile, in her case the action was forgivable because of her sex.

While Beer's husband Frederick was buried in his father's large mausoleum in Highgate Cemetery in north London, her family intervened to prevent her burial in that bastion of Anglican religion. Instead she was due to be interred in the Sassoon family mausoleum in Brighton, Sussex.

However, her grave is now located in the municipal cemetery at Tunbridge Wells, and a marker has been added to her headstone in recognition of her work as a journalist and editor, paid for by The Observer and The Sunday Times.Observer and Sunday Times pay for grave memorial to Fleet Street's first female editor Rachel Beer UK Press Gazette 9 July 2020

 References 

Bibliography

Negev, Eilat and Yehuda Koren (2011) The First Lady of Fleet Street: A Biography of Rachel Beer''. (London: JR Books). 

1858 births
1927 deaths
British Jews
British newspaper editors
Converts to Anglicanism from Judaism
British India emigrants to the United Kingdom
Writers from Mumbai
People from Royal Tunbridge Wells
Rachel
The Observer people
The Sunday Times people
Journalists from Maharashtra
Women writers from Maharashtra
19th-century Indian journalists
20th-century Indian journalists
Indian women newspaper editors
19th-century Indian women writers
19th-century Indian writers
20th-century Indian women writers
Indian newspaper journalists
Jewish women writers
Jewish non-fiction writers
Indian women journalists
British women journalists
Indian people of Iraqi-Jewish descent
British people of Iraqi-Jewish descent
Deaths from syphilis